Estadio Polideportivo Sur is a multi-purpose stadium in Envigado, Colombia that is currently used mostly for football matches. The stadium has a capacity of 11,000 people and was built in 1992. Envigado FC play their home matches at this stadium.

The stadium was renovated in 2009 to prepare for the 2010 South American Games held in Medellín. The renovations added a roof to the main section to protect the fans from weather and beautified the green areas outside the stadium.

Concerts
Estadio Polideportivo Sur has been an important venue for concerts in Medellín.

References

Sports venues completed in 1992
Football venues in Colombia
Estadio Polideportivo Sur
Estadio Polideportivo Sur